

William Hulme Hooper (13 June 1826 – 19 May 1854) was an English Royal Navy officer and Arctic explorer who served on  under Commander Thomas E. L. Moore, which sailed out of Plymouth, England, in 1848, on a mission to find the lost remains of Sir John Franklin's Northwest Passage expedition of 1845.

South of the Bering Straits at the onset of winter, the Plover  overwintered in Providence Bay, Siberia, which they named for the fortune that brought them there. Hooper and his companions fell in with the Chukchi, an experience he wrote about in his book Ten Months among the Tents of the Tuski (1853).

His health weakened by three Arctic winters, Hooper died in London on 19 May 1854.

References

Footnotes

Bibliography

External links 
 
 
 

19th-century explorers
1826 births
1854 deaths
Explorers of the Arctic
Military personnel from Portsmouth
Royal Navy officers